The Ritvo Autism & Asperger Diagnostic Scale (RAADS) is a psychological self-rating scale developed by Dr. Riva Ariella Ritvo ( NPI UCLA and CSC Yale). An abridged and translated 14 question version was then developed at the Department of Clinical Neuroscience at the Karolinska Institute, to aid in the identification of patients who may have undiagnosed ASD.



Background 
Autism is difficult to diagnose in adults because of symptom overlap with developmental disabilities and disorders. This poses a challenge to psychiatrists in identifying undiagnosed adults who may have autism. Adults are being referred or self referred for diagnosis with increasing frequency, making this a useful clinical tool. A score of 64 or more has been shown to be consistent and support a clinical diagnosis, but in the case the clinical diagnosis differs from the test score, the clinical diagnosis should take precedence.

Limitations
There are a few limitations to the RAADS test that make it important to use alongside professional clinical diagnostic processes. Some limitations may include questions being misinterpreted or misunderstood, unawareness or over-reporting of symptoms, and the same symptoms being rated different levels of "obtrusiveness" in daily functioning. Questions of the validity of the test have come up, but studies of over a decade prove it to be promising in the diagnostic process.

See also
 Diagnostic classification and rating scales used in psychiatry
 Autism
 Asperger syndrome

References

External links
 Online version of the RAADS-14 (14-item version)

Autism screening and assessment tools